Petter's soft-furred mouse, or Petter's praomys (Praomys petteri) is a species of rodent in the family Muridae.
It is found in Cameroon, Central African Republic, and Republic of the Congo.
Its natural habitat is subtropical or tropical moist lowland forests.

References

Sources

Praomys
Mammals described in 2003
Taxonomy articles created by Polbot